Joan Röell (21 July 1844 – 13 July 1914) was a Dutch nobleman, lawyer and statesman. He was a member of a prominent Dutch noble family which produced many public administrators, and politicians.

From 1894 to 1897 Röell headed the Dutch government as Prime Minister, (formally: chairman of the Council of Ministers) and Minister of Foreign Affairs.

Early life and education

He attended a boarding school in Sassenheim, and later a gymnasium in Utrecht. From 1861 to 23 November 1866, he studied Roman and Contemporary Law at Utrecht University, after which he briefly worked as a lawyer.

Political career
As a former registrar of the States of South Holland, Röell was familiar with the intricacies of local and regional government and water management. In 1877, he was elected into the House of Representatives for the district of Utrecht. He was re-elected in 1881 and 1884, but lost his seat to Æneas, Baron Mackay in 1886. He became a member of the Senate for Zeeland until he won back his seat in the House from Mackay in 1888. He was re-elected again in 1891. In the House, he was concerned with various policy areas, including education, water management, health, constitutional amendment, suffrage, home affairs, Indian affairs and taxes.

After the 1894 general election, Röell became formateur, and formed a liberal cabinet in which he served as Minister of Foreign Affairs. He also became the chairman of the Council of Ministers, a position that would later be dubbed Prime Minister. In 1886, his cabinet greatly expanded suffrage, doubling the electorate.

In 1897, after finishing his term, he stood for election to the House of Representatives again, but was not elected, and returned to the Senate one year later. In 1901, Röell returned to House of Representatives for the district  of Utrecht II. After his re-election in 1905, he served as President of the House of Representatives, until he lost his seat in 1909. After another stint in the Senate for North Holland, from 1910 to 1912, Röell was appointed Vice-President of the Council of State. Röell died on 13 July 1914 in The Hague, eight days before his 70th birthday, and was buried in the family vault in Leusden three days later.

Private life
Röell married Jonkvrouw Eritia Ena Romelia de Beaufort (1843 – 1910) in Utrecht on 10 September 1868. The couple remained childless.

Notes

References

External links
 

1844 births
1914 deaths
Prime Ministers of the Netherlands
Vice-presidents of the Council of State (Netherlands)
Ministers of Foreign Affairs of the Netherlands
Speakers of the House of Representatives (Netherlands)
Members of the House of Representatives (Netherlands)
Members of the Council of State (Netherlands)
Aide-de-camp to the Monarch of the Netherlands
Independent politicians in the Netherlands
Jonkheers of the Netherlands
Dutch members of the Dutch Reformed Church
People from Haarlem
Dutch people of German descent